The Jan H. Hofmeyr School of Social Work was the first institution to train black social workers in South Africa.

History 
The Jan H. Hofmeyr School of Social Work started operating on January 15, 1941 in Eloff Street, Johannesburg, under directorship of Congregational minister Rev. Ray Phillips. It was opened in 1941 by Ray Phillips and supported by among others, Job Richard Rathebe (trained as a social worker in the USA and member of the South African Institute of Race Relations) and A.B. Xuma (President of the ANC in 1940). The School was funded with help from the Young Men's Christian Association (YMCA) and the Afrikaner philanthropist Hofmeyr. Hofmeyr was Minister of Finance and of Education under Jan Smuts in 1939, and also president of cd municipal building that also housed the Johannesburg City Council's Jubilee Social Centre. From 1949 the school functioned independently from the YMCA (Cobley 1997:148-49).

After the National Party gained power in 1948, the apartheid state stopped subsidizing private education, and the Jan Hofmeyr School was forced to close in 1960 (Gray and Mazibuko 2002:198).

Alumni 
Students who had trained at the School included:
 Gibson Kente (1932–2004), playwright  
 Ellen Kuzwayo (1914–2006), 1953, educator, social worker, activist, member of the Committee of Ten 
 Nomzamo Winifred Zanyiwe Madikizela, 1953, a former wife of Nelson Mandela, social worker, activist
 Joshua Nkomo (1917–1999), ca. 1942, Zimbabwean politician 
 Louis Petersen [1917–2002], music administrator
 Eduardo Chivambo Mondlane (1920–1969), class of 1948, educator and founder of the Mozambique Liberation Front (1962)

See also 
 The Bantu Men's Social Centre

References 
 Cobley, Alan. The Rules of the Game - Struggles in Black Recreation and Social Welfare Policy in South Africa, 1997.
 Gray, Mel and Mazibuko, F, Social work in South Africa at the dawn of the new millennium. International Journal of Social Welfare, Vol. 11, 2002: 191-200.
 Harms Smith, L. 'Historiography of South African social work'. Social Work / Maatskaplike Werk, Vol. 50 (3):305-331
 Healy, Lynne M. International Social Work: Professional Action in an Interdependent World. New York: Oxford University Press, 2001.

1941 establishments in South Africa
1960 disestablishments in South Africa
Defunct organisations based in South Africa
Educational institutions established in 1941
Educational institutions disestablished in 1960
Higher education in South Africa
Schools of social work